Lin Rong-te (born 6 October 1959) is a Taiwanese politician.

Lin was born on 6 October 1959, in Hsinchu City, Taiwan. He earned a bachelor's degree in business administration from the University of the West, then completed an executive master of business administration degree from National Chengchi University.

Lin was a member of the third National Assembly. Lin later served on the Central Standing Committee of the Kuomintang. Lin was a candidate for the 2016 Kuomintang chairmanship election, but dropped out before the vote took place. He became acting chair of the Kuomintang on 15 January 2020, after Wu Den-yih resigned the office on the same date, in an effort to take responsibility for Han Kuo-yu's loss in the 2020 Taiwanese presidential election.

References

1959 births
Living people
Chairpersons of the Kuomintang
National Chengchi University alumni
Politicians of the Republic of China on Taiwan from Hsinchu